Pardon My Berth Marks is the fourth short subject starring American comedian Buster Keaton made for Columbia Pictures. Keaton made a total of ten films for the studio between 1939 and 1941.

Synopsis
Elmer (Buster) is a newspaper reporter who boards a train and innocently becomes involved with a mobster's wife.

Production
Columbia remade this film in 1947 (with Harry Von Zell) as Rolling Down to Reno.

External links

Pardon My Berth Marks at the International Buster Keaton Society

1940 films
1940 comedy films
Columbia Pictures short films
American black-and-white films
Films directed by Del Lord
American comedy short films
1940s English-language films
1940s American films